FindYourFaceMate was an American dating website created by Christina Bloom that operated from 2011 to 2014. It attracted 50,000 customers. The website was based on theory that people are attracted to significant others with similar features.

Founder Christina Bloom died in December 2014, and the site shut down shortly thereafter.

References

Internet properties established in 2011
Online dating services of the United States
Internet properties disestablished in 2014